Mary Ross (18th-century – 1847) was an English shipbuilder. She is known as the successful shipbuilder of the British Navy during the Napoleonic Wars. She was married to Charles Ross (d. 1808) of Rochester and took over his company after his death.

References

19th-century English businesspeople
19th-century English businesswomen
18th-century births
1847 deaths
English shipbuilders
British people of the Napoleonic Wars
Women of the Regency era